Xylophanes furtadoi is a moth of the  family Sphingidae. It is known from Brazil.

The length of the forewings is about 78 mm. There are probably at least three generations with adults recorded in June and October.

The larvae probably feed on Rubiaceae and Malvaceae species.

References

furtadoi
Moths described in 2009
Endemic fauna of Brazil
Moths of South America